The domain name gov is a sponsored top-level domain (sTLD) in the Domain Name System of the Internet. The name is derived from the word government, indicating its restricted use by government entities. The TLD is administered by the Cybersecurity and Infrastructure Security Agency (CISA), a component of the United States Department of Homeland Security.

.gov is one of the original six top-level domains, defined in RFC 920. Though “originally intended for any kind of government office or agency”, only U.S.-based government organizations may register .gov domain names, a result of the Internet originating as a U.S. government-sponsored research network. 

Other countries typically delegate a second-level domain for government operations on their country-code top-level domain (ccTLD); for example, .gov.uk is the domain for the Government of the United Kingdom, and .gc.ca is the domain for the Government of Canada. The United States is the only country that has a government-specific top-level domain in addition to its ccTLD (.us).

.gov domains are registered at get.gov.

History

Beginning in 1997, the General Services Administration (GSA) began administering .gov. In February 2011, the GSA selected Verisign to manage the registry services, replacing Native Technologies, Inc. 

Responsibility for the TLD was transferred to the Cybersecurity and Infrastructure Security Agency (CISA) under the DOTGOV Online Trust in Government Act of 2020, part of the Consolidated Appropriations Act, 2021. 

In January 2023, CISA selected Cloudflare to replace Verisign in providing registry services. Cloudflare will also provide authoritative DNS services for the .gov domain.

Use
Many governments in the United States use a .gov domain, though most use .us (e.g., leg.state.nv.us), .com (e.g., myflorida.com), .org (e.g., lacity.org), or other TLDs (e.g., senate.mn). The full list of registered .gov domains is published at get.gov/data.

During GSA's administration of .gov, registration and annual renewal fees peaked at $400 per year. When CISA began managing the TLD in April 2021, all fees were removed.

Federal Executive branch policy requires the use of .gov for civilian agencies, but some U.S. government-related websites use non-.gov domain names, including the United States Postal Service (e.g., usps.com) and various recruiting websites for armed services (e.g., goarmy.com). The United States Department of Defense and its subsidiary organizations typically use the .mil sTLD instead of .gov.

Eligibility
U.S.-based government organizations and publicly controlled entities are eligible to obtain a .gov domain. This includes federal, state, local, or territorial government, as well as any tribal government recognized by the federal government or a state government. 

To register a .gov domain, an authorization letter must be submitted to CISA. The signer of the letter differs by entity type, but it is typically an agency's head, chief information officer (CIO), or highest-ranking or elected official.

Historically, only U.S. federal government agencies were allowed to register a .gov domain. In May 2002, GSA proposed a change that would open registration to state, local, and tribal governments in the U.S., a change that went into effect in March 2003.

In November 2019, before the transfer of .gov to CISA, GSA's authorization process was shown to be weak after someone impersonated the mayor of Exeter, Rhode Island in an authorization letter and successfully gained control of exeterri.gov. In response, GSA said it had implemented additional fraud prevention controls, and CISA advocated for transferring the TLD from GSA.

Policy
The DOTGOV Act requires that CISA maintain requirements that “minimize the risk of .gov internet domains whose names could mislead or confuse users”. These include:

 Requested names must correspond with the requesting entity's organization's name or services.
 Generic terms are reserved for federal agencies, though generic words can be combined with state or local municipality names.
 Most non-federal domain types require a two-letter United States postal abbreviations or state name equivalent, though exceptions are made. Rules have been established for municipalities whose names are unique, who are well-known, or that are among the most populous cities and counties in the nation.

The Act also requires that .gov domains not be used for political campaign or commercial purposes, and that domains are registered only by authorized individuals.

.gov has been used to serve certain policy goals. As an action following Executive Order 13571, President Barack Obama restricted executive branch agencies from registering new .gov domains in an attempt to eliminate unnecessary, redundant, or outdated sites. US government agencies used the .gov registrar to make it easy for new registrants to opt-in to HTTPS preloading  and to make it easier for the public to report potential security issues.

Use by states and territories
, all states, the District of Columbia, and all territories except for the Northern Mariana Islands have operational domains in gov:

International equivalents
While the use of gov as a top-level domain is restricted to the United States, several other countries have second-level domains of the same name or similar semantics for governmental purposes, including:

See also
 usa.gov
 .us

References

External links
 Official .gov registration site
 IANA gov whois information
  Domain Requirements (defined .com and the other original top-level domains)
  U.S. Government Internet Domain Names
 Complete list of .gov domains

Sponsored top-level domains
Domain names in the United States
General Services Administration
Computer-related introductions in 1985